Ceramanus is a genus of leafy liverworts in the family Lepidoziaceae.

References

External links
 
 Ceramanus at uniprot.org

Jungermanniales genera
Lepidoziaceae